Pyeongsan So clan was one of the Korean clans. Their Bon-gwan was in Pyongsan County, Hwanghae Province. According to the research in 2000, the number of Pyeongsan So clan was 725. Pyeongsan So clan was one of the descendants of Duke of Shao’s family in Zhou dynasty. Their founder was  who was a government official in Gyeongsang Province, Goryeo, during Myeongjong of Goryeo’s reign.

See also 
 Korean clan names of foreign origin

References

External links 
 

 
Korean clan names of Chinese origin